Rostock – Landkreis Rostock II is an electoral constituency (German: Wahlkreis) represented in the Bundestag. It elects one member via first-past-the-post voting. Under the current constituency numbering system, it is designated as constituency 14. It is located in northern Mecklenburg-Vorpommern, comprising the independent city of Rostock and the northern part of the Landkreis Rostock district.

Rostock – Landkreis Rostock II was created for the inaugural 1990 federal election after German reunification. Since 2021, it has been represented by Katrin Zschau of the Social Democratic Party (SPD).

Geography
Rostock – Landkreis Rostock II is located in northern Mecklenburg-Vorpommern. As of the 2021 federal election, it comprises the independent city of Rostock and northern parts of the Landkreis Rostock district, specifically the municipalities of Dummerstorf, Graal-Müritz, and Sanitz and the Ämter of Carbäk, Rostocker Heide, Schwaan, Tessin, and Warnow-West.

History
Rostock – Landkreis Rostock II was created after German reunification in 1990, then known as Rostock. Until 2002, it was constituency 265 in the numbering system. Originally, it comprised only the independent city of Rostock. In the 2005 election, it acquired the municipalities of Graal-Müritz and Sanitz and the Ämter of Carbäk, Rostocker Heide, and Tessin from the now-abolished Bad Doberan district. In the 2013 election, was further expanded to its current borders and renamed to Rostock – Landkreis Rostock II.

Members
The constituency was held by the Social Democratic Party (SPD) from its creation in 1990 until 2009, during which time it was represented by Christine Lucyga (until 2005) and Christian Kleiminger. In 2009, it was won by Steffen Bockhahn of The Left. Peter Stein of the Christian Democratic Union (CDU) won the constituency in 2013, and was re-elected in 2017. Katrin Zschau regained it for the SPD in 2021.

Election results

2021 election

2017 election

2013 election

2009 election

References

1990 establishments in Germany
Constituencies established in 1990
Federal electoral districts in Mecklenburg-Western Pomerania
Rostock (district)